Double clutch may refer to:

Double clutch, a baseball term for a fielder drawing his arm back twice before throwing
Double clutch (technique), a method of driving that involves pressing and releasing the clutch twice per shift
Double-clutch transmission, a type of transmission that has two separate clutches
Double-clutching (zoology), when an oviparous animal lays two sets of viable eggs in one season
Double Clutch (Transformers), a fictional character in the Transformers franchise
Double Clutch (video game), a Sega Mega Drive game released in 1993
Double Clutch (album), an album by Andrew Cyrille and Richard Teitelbaum

See also
Clutch (disambiguation)